Governor Hunter may refer to:

Archibald Hunter (1856–1936), Governor of Omdurman in Sudan in 1899 and Governor of Gibraltar from 1910 to 1913
John Hunter (Royal Navy officer) (1737–1821), governor of New South Wales, Australia, from 1795 to 1800
Governor Hunter (ship), an Australian ship launched in 1805 and wrecked on the east coast of Australia in 1816
Peter Hunter (British Army officer) (1746–1805), Governor of British Honduras, from 1790 to 1791 and military governor of County Wexford, Ireland following the Irish Rebellion of 1798
Robert Hunter (governor) (1666–1734), colonial governor of New York and New Jersey from 1710 to 1720, and governor of Jamaica from 1727 to 1734